Group A of the 2010 Fed Cup Americas Zone Group I was one of two pools in the Americas Zone Group I of the 2010 Fed Cup. Four teams competed in a round robin competition, with the top team and the bottom two teams proceeding to their respective sections of the play-offs: the top teams played for advancement to the World Group II Play-offs, while the bottom teams faced potential relegation to Group II.

Canada vs. Cuba

Brazil vs. Puerto Rico

Canada vs. Puerto Rico

Brazil vs. Cuba

Canada vs. Brazil

Puerto Rico vs. Cuba

See also
Fed Cup structure

References

External links
 Fed Cup website

2010 Fed Cup Americas Zone